Neil Haines is a former association football player who represented New Zealand at international level.

Haines made a solitary official international appearance for New Zealand as a substitute in a 2–0 win over Singapore on 1 October 1978.

References 

Year of birth missing (living people)
Living people
New Zealand association footballers
New Zealand international footballers
Association footballers not categorized by position